ESP-r is an open-sourced building performance energy modeling software that was created by the University of Strathclyde.  It is primarily used in research, as a tool for consultants or as a teaching tool.  ESP-r can model the thermal, visual and acoustic performance of a building as well as to estimate the heat, moisture and electrical power of the modeled building.

ESP-r calculates building performance values based on a finite volume approach where it solves a set of conservation equations. It was developed in 1974 and was converted in 2002 to the GNU Public License.  ESP-r is designed to work on the Unix operating system yet can be run in Windows using a Unix modulator or run with the Windows version. The current ESP-r Archivist is Ian Beausoleil Morrison.

Some advantages that ESP-r has are its power and flexibility enables a well-informed user to optimize a house.  The power behind ESP-r is its holistic nature and range to features.  The downside is that the details and lack of documentations means users need specific knowledge to complete complex tasks.  ESP-r is still mainly a research tool even though it is used for some consulting and teaching applications.

ESP-r has been extensively validated and there are various studies and thesis done on the topic.

References

Free software